Lilyvale railway station is a former railway station on the Illawarra (South Coast) railway line in New South Wales, Australia.

The first Lilyvale station opened in 1890 as 'Lilydale' station to service the small village of Lilyvale. This first Lilyvale station was located just south of the southern portal of the Lilyvale tunnel at the northern end of the Bulgo or Otford valley. To the north were the original Metropolitan Colliery siding junction with signal box and short platform and then Helensburgh station. To the south were Vickery siding and Otford station and sidings. The first Lilyvale station consisted of a single platform and weatherboard building on the western side of the original single track alignment. A road passed over a level crossing of the railway line between the tunnel and the station.  This crossing was an Accommodation Works crossing under the Public Works Act and cannot be closed by the railways or government so users still have a right to cross the railway.

New alignment sections of the railway were constructed between Cawley and Clifton from 1912 to 1915 and the new dual track passed through a new tunnel just to the east of the old Lilvale tunnel and at a slightly lower elevation. A second Lilyvale railway station, just to the south of the original opened in 1915.  The second station consisted of two side platforms with weatherboard buildings and a steel overhead footbridge. Just to the south was a single lane brick vehicle bridge which was built as Accommodation Works under the Public Works Act and cannot be closed by the railway or government.

Lilyvale station was serviced by mainline Thirroul-Waterfall trains, but train ceased to service the station in 1983. The weatherboard buildings had long been removed and the station and bridges were demolished with the electrification of the line in 1989. As the vehicle bridge was an Accommodation Works crossing under the Public Works Act users have a right to cross the railway.

References

Disused regional railway stations in New South Wales
Railway stations in Australia opened in 1890
Railway stations closed in 1983
Lilyvale, New South Wales